Sgùrr a' Choire-bleithe is a 913-m mountain in the remote Knoydart area of Lochaber, Northwest Highlands, Scotland.

It is one of highest Corbetts at 913.3 metres, and misses out on Munro status by just over one metre. The summit is the culminating point of a long and rugged ridge that stretches from Loch Quoich to Barrisdale Bay.

References

Mountains and hills of the Northwest Highlands
Marilyns of Scotland
Corbetts